The Epiphone Casino is a thinline hollow body electric guitar manufactured by Epiphone, a branch of Gibson. The guitar debuted in 1961 and has been associated with such guitarists as Howlin' Wolf, George Harrison, John Lennon, Paul McCartney, Keith Richards, Dave Davies, Brad Whitford, Shirley Manson, Paul Weller, The Edge, Josh Homme, Daniel Kessler, Brendon Urie, Gary Clark, Jr., Glenn Frey, John Illsley,  and Peter Green.

Casinos have been manufactured in the United States, Japan, Korea and China.

Construction 
The Casino, also designated by Epiphone as model E230TD, is a thinline hollow-bodied guitar with two Gibson P-90 pick-ups. Although generally fitted with a trapeze-type tailpiece, often a Bigsby vibrato tailpiece is used in its place (either as a factory direct feature or as an aftermarket upgrade). Unlike semi-hollow body guitars such as the Gibson ES-335, which have a center block to promote sustain and reduce feedback, the Casino and its cousin, the Gibson ES-330 are true hollow-bodied guitars. This makes it lighter, and louder when played without an amplifier, but much more prone to feedback than semi-hollow or solid-body electrics. The Casino neck joins the body at the 16th fret instead of the 19th like on the Gibson ES models.

Early versions of the Casino had a spruce top. Through 1970, the Casino headstock was set at a 17-degree angle and the top was made of five laminated layers of  maple, birch, maple, birch, and maple.  With the exception of the John Lennon models, subsequent Casinos have been made with 14-degree headstock angle with five layer all maple laminated tops. Current versions have a laminated maple top, sides, and back, and a mahogany neck.

Per the Epiphone String Gauge Guide, the Casino comes with string gauges (from high to low): 0.010" 0.013" 0.017" 0.026" 0.036" 0.046".

Use by the Beatles 

In 1964, Paul McCartney, The Beatles' bass player, was the first Beatle to acquire a Casino (a 1962 model), using it for his studio forays into guitar work, including his guitar solos on "Ticket to Ride" (1965), "Drive My Car" (1965) and "Taxman" (1966); he also played it on “Helter Skelter” (1968). In 1965 John Lennon and George Harrison bought 1965 Casinos, which are clearly seen in photos of concerts held in Germany, the Philippines, Japan and North American concerts (last World Tour, June - August 1966).

John Lennon used the Epiphone Casino as his main electric instrument during the remainder of his time with the Beatles, replacing the Rickenbacker 325. In 1968 when the band were making the double album The Beatles, Lennon had the pickguard removed from his Casino and professionally sanded to bare wood and lightly lacquered with two thin coats of nitro-cellulose. In the early seventies, the original tuners were replaced with a set of gold Grover tuners or machine heads. His stripped guitar (still with the original nickel tuners) is first seen in the "Revolution" promo film. The guitar was used at The Rolling Stones Rock and Roll Circus in December 1968, the Apple rooftop concert on January 30, 1969, and the concert of Live Peace in Toronto 1969 with the Plastic Ono Band on September 13, 1969. It can also be seen in the Let It Be film, including the rooftop concert,  and most other pictures of Lennon playing guitar after that time. The guitar can be seen in the How Do You Sleep? music video.

Harrison had his fitted with a Bigsby trem, removed the pickguard (it can be seen in this state in the "Hello Goodbye" and "Penny Lane" videos, and in pictures of the final Beatles show in San Francisco, 1966). He also had it sanded down in 1968.

Current Casinos 

Epiphone currently builds several versions of the Casino. These include:
 Regular "Archtop-Series" Casino made in China and uses non-American made parts (Korea until 2007)
 Elitist Casino. Made in Japan and set-up in America, and contains American made parts such as the pickups. Body is 5-ply maple, Gibson P-90 pickups, and nickel hardware.
 Casino Coupé. A smaller version. The body is the same size as a Gibson ES-339.
 Inspired by John Lennon were made in China with American-made "Tribute" P-90 pickups and a five-ply maple body and are less expensive versions of the now defunct United States Collection John Lennon 1965 / Revolution Casino bodies were built in Japan and assembled in America. The 1965 version has a sunburst finish, white pick guard and small button Grover tuners. The Revolution version was based on the modifications Lennon made to his 1965 Casino during the recording of the White Album, which include a "stripped" (natural) satin finish, gold Grover tuners, no pickguard, a deeper set-in neck, and Lennon's serial number on the back of the headstock.
 Limited Edition 1961 Casino. This limited version is offered in Royal Tan and Vintage Sunburst, with either a trapeze tailpiece or a tremotone tremolo. It sports a 5-layer maple-birch body, Gibson P-90 pickups, "short" headstock, bullet trussrod cover, tortoiseshell pickguard, and pre-Gibson era Epiphone badge.
 In 2021 a Gibson USA made Epiphone Casino became available.
 The Epiphone Sorrento model is identical to the Casino in every way, except for the single cutaway rather than the double cut. Also, the Sorrento was offered with a different selection of colors.

References

External links 

 

Casino
Semi-acoustic guitars
The Beatles' musical instruments

sv:Epiphone Casino VT